Gerd Visheh (also Romanized as Gerd Vīsheh and Gardvishāh; also known as Gardevishe and Gerdeh Bīsheh) is a village in Khorgam Rural District, Khorgam District, Rudbar County, Gilan Province, Iran. At the 2006 census, its population was 221, in 66 families.

References 

Populated places in Rudbar County